Street Musique is a 1972 animated short film by Ryan Larkin produced by the National Film Board of Canada (NFB). It is a line animation of "music as performance", in which actions of the film's characters are choreographed to the music of street musicians.

Soon after returning from the 42nd Academy Awards in 1970, for which his animated short film Walking had been nominated, Larkin was loaned by the NFB to a Vancouver art school, where he stayed for eight months conducting animation workshops. He would travel to each student's studio to direct them, one of which was a group of street musicians. These street musicians were the origin of the idea for the film, as Larkin had stated that "they would make a great focal point for my abstract images".

The film consists of five or six vaguely defined segments whose animation matches the pace of the music to which it is set. It begins with a photograph of a musician that is replaced by a line drawing of that photograph. A transition leads to images of a man's body transforming into abstract improvisational forms using line shading and watercolours. The figures undergo a continuous metamorphosis throughout the film. Chris Robinson stated that the film's awkward ending is indicative of Larkin's creative hesitancy, as the last image is a figure waiting for music. Larkin said that he "ran out of ideas" and "didn't know how to end the film".

The film cost $45,734 to make.

The film also received the Jury's First Prize at the Berlin Film Festival of Animated Films. Larkin was fond of the Melbourne International Film Festival award because Street Musique "was a ten minute film up against all kinds of complicated feature films".

In 2000, after having lived on the streets in Montreal and spending his nights at the Old Brewery Mission, Larkin met Chris Robinson. During a discussion, Larkin told Robinson that after creating Street Musique, he was bereft of ideas for new projects. Robinson invited Larkin to be a member of the selection committee for the Ottawa International Animation Festival. The other three members were Chris Landreth, Pjotr Sapegin, and Andrei Svislotksi, none of whom were aware of Larkin's identity. After reviewing selections, they screened each other's films. Larkin was last, showing Walking, Street Musique, and Syrinx. Landreth was immediately inspired to create a documentary film about Larkin's life, which became Ryan. The animated documentary incorporated in their entirety Street Musique and Walking. Larkin's character in Ryan is animated to dance with characters from Street Musique.

Awards
 International Week of Animation Cinema, Barcelona: Molinillo de Oro, First Prize, Special Techniques, 1972
 Melbourne International Film Festival, Melbourne: Grand Prix – Gold Boomerang, 1973
 International Short Film Festival Oberhausen, Oberhausen: First Prize of the International Animation Film Jury, 1973
 Columbus International Film & Animation Festival, Columbus, Ohio: Chris Bronze Plaque, 1973 
 FIBA International Festival of Buenos Aires, Buenos Aires: Honorable Mention, 1974

Notes

References

Works cited

External links
Street Musique at the National Film Board of Canada

Animated films without speech
1972 films
Canadian animated short films
National Film Board of Canada animated short films
Visual music
Films directed by Ryan Larkin
1970s animated short films
1972 animated films
Animated musical films
Canadian musical films
1970s Canadian films